Chebaki is the name of severalrural localities in Russia:
Chebaki, Republic of Khakassia, a village in Chernoozerny Selsoviet of Shirinsky District of the Republic of Khakassia
Chebaki, Kurgan Oblast, a selo in Chebakovsky Selsoviet of Makushinsky District of Kurgan Oblast
Chebaki, Novosibirsk Oblast, a selo in Severny District of Novosibirsk Oblast
Chebaki, Perm Krai, a village in Permsky District of Perm Krai

Ancient Fortress 
Chebaki Fortress Sve-Takh - an ancient fortress in Republic of Khakassia, Russia